Scarpetta is a novel by Patricia Cornwell.  It was published in 2008 by G. P. Putnam's Sons.  The book is a continuation of Cornwell's popular Kay Scarpetta series.

Plot
Leaving behind her private forensic pathology practice in Charleston, South Carolina, Kay Scarpetta accepts an assignment in New York City, where the NYPD has asked her to examine an injured man on Bellevue Hospital’s psychiatric prison ward. The handcuffed and chained patient, Oscar Bane, has specifically asked for her, and when she literally has her gloved hands on him, he begins to talk—and the story he has to tell turns out to be one of the most bizarre she has ever heard.

The injuries, he says, were sustained in the course of a murder . . . that he did not commit. Is Bane a criminally insane stalker who has fixed on Scarpetta? Or is his paranoid tale true, and it is he who is being spied on, followed and stalked by the actual killer? The one thing Scarpetta knows for certain is that a woman has been tortured and murdered—and more violent deaths will follow. Gradually, an inexplicable and horrifying truth emerges: Whoever is committing the crimes knows where his prey is at all times. Is it a person, a government? And what is the connection between the victims?

In the days that follow, Scarpetta; her forensic psychologist husband, Benton Wesley; and her niece, Lucy, who has recently formed her own forensic computer investigation firm in New York, will undertake a harrowing chase through cyberspace and the all-too-real streets of the city—an odyssey that will take them at once to places they never knew, and much, much too close to home.

References

External links
Scarpetta's official web-page
USA Today profile of Scarpetta

2008 American novels
Novels by Patricia Cornwell
Novels set in New York City
American crime novels
G. P. Putnam's Sons books